Fred Proud is a British theatre director. He graduated from Rose Bruford College of Speech and Drama in 1967. He is the co-founder of the Soho Theatre Company, which he set up with his partner, the writer Verity Bargate, in 1969. Known at the time as the Soho Poly Theatre, it won wide acclaim for its production of cutting-edge plays  establishing itself as a home of good acting and arresting texts, which ranged from modern English and American plays to Sheridan. He was artistic director with the company for many years - initially at the Soho Theatre, 6a, New Compton Street, then for two seasons of plays at the King's Head, 199 Upper Street and thereafter at the Soho Poly in Riding House Street. The Soho Poly was the starting point for many of the best-known actors, writers, designers and directors still working today. It was especially important in the showcasing of women in the theatre. He continued directing at such venues as the Ludlow Festival, Greenwich Theatre and the Yvonne Arnaud Theatre. He returned to the Riding House space when it was revived by the University of Westminster helping with the restoration and giving poetry readings and talks. In 2018 he directed a staged reading of Friedrich Durrenmatt’s play One Autumn Evening starring Peter Marinker, Paul Alexander, James Sanderson and Poppy Abbott to mark exactly 50 years since the Soho Theatre was founded. This play was the first ever production by the company, performed at the Open Space in 1968. He puts his verse speaking skills to good use on his YouTube channel (Fred Proud@Caspar33).

Now retired, Proud divides his time between London and Minas Gerais in Brazil.

References

British theatre directors
Living people
Year of birth missing (living people)